Marcel Răducan (born 10 February 1967) is a Moldovan politician, a deputy in the Legislature 2005–2009 elected on the lists of the Electoral Bloc Democratic Moldova. From 2009 to February 2015 he served as Minister of Regional Development and Construction in the First Vlad Filat Cabinet and in the Second Filat Cabinet as well. From 30 November 2018 he is the President of the Competition Council.

Biography 
Răducan was born on 10 February 1967 in Grinăuți-Moldova, Ocnița district. He is an engineer-mechanic, executive director of the enterprise with foreign capital "Avirom-Prod". In March 2005, he was elected a deputy in the Parliament from the "Our Moldova" Bloc. He is a member of the Democratic Party of Moldova. From 2005 until 2009 he was a member of the Parliament of the Republic of Moldova, member of the parliamentary commission for agriculture and processing industry and of the Committee on Agriculture and Food Industry, from the faction of the Democratic Party of Moldova.

By the Decree of the President of the Republic of Moldova no. 4-V from 25 September 2009 was appointed Minister of Regional Development and Construction of the Republic of Moldova. He was in office until December 2014, than until the Gaburici Cabinet was invested in February 2015.

In April 2015, he was awarded the "Order of Honor".

Family
Marcel Răducan is married to Aurelia Răducan, a doctor, and has two boys: Gicu and Călin.

External links 
 Government of Moldova

References

 

Living people
1967 births
People from Ocnița District
Moldovan MPs 2005–2009
Moldovan MPs 2009–2010
Democratic Party of Moldova MPs
Recipients of the Order of Honour (Moldova)